Somewhere Winter is a 2019 Chinese teen romance film written by Rao Xueman and directed by Wang Weiming. It stars Wallace Huo and Ma Sichun. The film follows the love story of An Ran, a student of Beijing Normal University, and Qi Xiao, a Taiwanese photographer. The film premiered in China on November 15, 2019.

Cast
 Wallace Huo as Qi Xiao, a Taiwanese photographer developing his career in Beijing.
 Ma Sichun as An Ran, a student of Beijing Normal University.
 Wei Daxun as Yu Feng, classmate and best friend of An Ran, son of a professor.
 Zhang Yao as Sun Yaoyao, An Ran's best friend.
 Lin Baihong as Qi Yitian, son of Qi Xiao.
 Wen Qi as Yu Xiaonian, daughter of An Ran, a Chinese American who was raised in Los Angeles.
 Patty Hou as Ye Yuchen
 Chyi Chin as Chyi Chin

Soundtrack

Production
In 2015, Chyi Chin and Rao Xueman discussed making his song Possibly in Winter or Around the Winter Season into a film. Based on the song, Rao Xueman wrote a novel, which was published in 2018. The film is adapted from Rao Xueman's eponymous novel.

Shooting began on February 15, 2019 and ended on April 19, 2019.

This film was shot in Beijing, Tianjin, Taipei and Los Angeles.

Release
On October 11, 2019, the first official trailer for the film was released along with a teaser poster.

The film premiered in Shanghai on November 11, 2019 with wide-release in China on November 15, 2019.

Reception
The film is rated just 5.3/10 on Douban, the influential Chinese film reviews website.

References

External links
 
 
 

2019 films
Chinese romance films
Films shot in Beijing
Films shot in Tianjin
Films shot in Taiwan
Films shot in Los Angeles
Films set in Beijing
Films set in Tianjin
Films set in Taiwan
Films set in Los Angeles
2010s Mandarin-language films